Charles O'Connor (born 9 April 1946) is an Irish Fianna Fáil politician. He was a Teachta Dála (TD) for the Dublin South-West constituency from 2002 to 2011.

O'Connor was born in Dublin in 1946. He was educated at Synge Street CBS, Drimnagh Castle CBS, the Irish Management Institute and the Industrial Relations Institute. O'Connor first became involved in politics in 1991 when he was elected to Dublin County Council, becoming a member of South Dublin County Council when it was created in 1994, of which O'Connor was also a member until 2003. He served as Cathaoirleach (Chairperson) of South Dublin County Council from 1999 to 2000.

He was unsuccessful on his first attempt at the 1992 general election to be elected to Dáil Éireann, but ten years later he was elected to the 29th Dáil at the 2002 general election. He was re-elected at the 2007 general election. He lost his seat at the 2011 general election, receiving 5.8% of the first preference vote.

He was elected to South Dublin County Council for the Tallaght Central electoral area at the 2014 local elections and re-elected in 2019. He was an unsuccessful candidate for Dublin South-West at the 2020 general election.

References

 

1946 births
Living people
Councillors of Dublin County Council
Fianna Fáil TDs
Local councillors in South Dublin (county)
Members of the 29th Dáil
Members of the 30th Dáil
People educated at Synge Street CBS